William Newman (January 12, 1873 – October 21, 1953) was an Ontario farmer and political figure. A Liberal member in the Legislative Assembly of Ontario, he represented Victoria North from 1926 to 1934 and Victoria from 1934 to 1937.

He was born in Edwardsburgh Township, Grenville County, Ontario, the son of John W. Newman. He was educated in Prescott and Kingston. In 1903, he married a Miss Evelyn Allen, and they had one son, Allen. He raised dairy cattle near Lorneville and was president of the Eastern Ontario Dairymans Association and the Eastern Ontario Creameries Association.

References 
 Canadian Parliamentary Guide, 1934, AL Normandin

External links 

1873 births
1953 deaths
Ontario Liberal Party MPPs